Bučin (Macedonian Cyrillic: Бучин) is a village which lies in the Kruševo district of North Macedonia on both banks of the Crna River.

The village maintains a distinct bridge built in the Ottoman Empire, and is home to a unique old building constructed above the surface of the Crna River. The village now known as Bucin was part of the land of Ancient Macedonia called Alcomenae or Alkomenai which was a town of the Deuriopes on the Erigon, in the Pelagonia Region in Ancient Macedonia. Its site is tentatively located near modern Bučin (Buchin) in North Macedonia.  The main produce of the village is onions. Peppers, tomatoes, leeks, tobacco, garlic and beans are also grown.

Demographics
According to the 2021 census, the village had a total of 522 inhabitants. Ethnic groups in the village include:

Macedonians 738

References

Villages in Kruševo Municipality